Temple Bar is a building that was until 1878 the principal ceremonial entrance to the City of London from the City of Westminster; since relocated, it is today the home of the Worshipful Company of Chartered Architects and an education centre focused on architecture and heritage in the City of London.

In the middle ages, London expanded its city jurisdiction beyond its walls to gates, called ‘bars’, erected across thoroughfares. To the west of the City of London, the bar was located in the area known as the Temple. Temple Bar was situated on the historic royal ceremonial route from the Tower of London to the Palace of Westminster, the two chief residences of the medieval English monarchs, and from the Palace of Westminster to St Paul's Cathedral. The road east of where Temple Bar once stood and within the City is Fleet Street, while the road to the west, in Westminster, is The Strand.

The Corporation of the City of London formerly erected a barrier to regulate trade into the City at the west end of Fleet Street. The 19th century Royal Courts of Justice are located close by on the north side, having been moved from Westminster Hall. To its south is the Temple Church, along with the Inner Temple and Middle Temple Inns of Court. As the most important entrance to the City of London from Westminster, it was formerly long the custom for the monarch to halt at Temple Bar before entering the City of London, in order for the Lord Mayor to offer the Corporation's pearl-encrusted Sword of State as a token of loyalty. 

The term 'Temple Bar' strictly refers to a notional bar or barrier across the route, but it is now used to refer to the 17th-century ornamental Baroque arched gateway designed by Christopher Wren, which spanned the road until its removal in 1878. A memorial pedestal topped by a dragon symbol of London, and containing an image of Queen Victoria, was erected to mark the bar's location in 1880. Wren's arch was preserved and was re-erected in 2004 in the City, in Paternoster Square next to St Paul's Cathedral. In September 2022 it was officially opened by the Duke of Gloucester as the home of the architects' livery company.

Background
In the Middle Ages, the authority of the City of London Corporation reached beyond the City's ancient defensive walls in several places, known as the Liberties of London. To regulate trade into the City, barriers were erected on the major entrance routes wherever the true boundary was a substantial distance from the nearest ancient gatehouse in the walls. Temple Bar was the most used of these, since traffic between the City of London (England's prime commercial centre) and the Palace of Westminster (the political centre) passed through it. It was located where Fleet Street now meets The Strand, which is outside London's old boundary wall.

Its name derives from the Temple Church, adjoining to the south, which has given its name to a wider area south of Fleet Street, the Temple, once belonging to the Knights Templar but now home to two of the legal profession's Inns of Court.

The historic ceremony of the monarch halting at Temple Bar and being met by the Lord Mayor has often featured in art and literature. It is commented on in televised coverage of modern-day royal ceremonial processions.

History

A bar is first mentioned in 1293 and was probably only a chain or bar between a row of posts. More substantial structures with arches followed. After the Battle of Evesham of 1265, Prince Edward punished the rebellious Londoners, who had befriended Simon de Montfort, by taking away all their street chains and bars, and storing them in the Tower of London. By 1351, a wooden archway had been built housing a small prison above it. The earliest known documentary and historical notice of Temple Bar is in 1327, concerning a hearing before the mayor regarding a right of way in the area. In 1384, Richard II granted a licence for paving the Strand Street from Temple Bar to the Savoy, and collecting tolls to cover the expense.

On 5 November 1422, the corpse of Henry V was borne to Westminster Abbey by the chief citizens and nobles, and every doorway from Southwark to Temple Bar had a torch-bearer. In 1503 the hearse of Elizabeth of York, queen of Henry VII, halted at Temple Bar, on its way from the Tower to Westminster, and at the Bar the Abbots of Westminster and Bermondsey blessed the corpse, and the Earl of Derby and a large company of nobles joined the funeral procession. Anne Boleyn passed through the Bar on May 31, 1534, the day before her coronation, on her way to the Tower. On that occasion Temple Bar was new painted and repaired, and near it stood singing men and children—the Fleet Street conduit all the time running claret.

In 1554, Thomas Wyatt led an uprising in opposition to Queen Mary I's proposed marriage to Philip II of Spain. When he had fought his way down Piccadilly to The Strand, Temple Bar was thrown open to him, or forced open by him; but when he had been repulsed at Ludgate he was hemmed in by cavalry at Temple Bar, where he surrendered. This revolt persuaded the government to go through with the verdict against Lady Jane Grey.

The notable Scottish bookseller Andrew Millar owned his first London shop at Temple Bar, taken over from the ownership of James McEuen in 1728, to whom Millar had been apprenticed.

Wren's Temple Bar Gate

Although the Bar Gate escaped damage by the Great Fire of London of 1666, it was rebuilt as part of the general improvement works made throughout the City after that devastating event. Commissioned by King Charles II, and attributed to Sir Christopher Wren, the fine arch of Portland stone was constructed between 1669 and 1672, by Thomas Knight, the City Mason, and Joshua Marshall, Master of the Mason's Company and King's Master Mason. The statues of Anne of Denmark, James l, Charles I, and Charles II, in niches in the upper floor were carved by John Bushnell.

Rusticated, it is a two-story structure consisting of one wide central arch for the road traffic, flanked on both sides by narrower arches for pedestrians. On the upper part, four statues celebrate the 1660 Restoration of the Stuart monarchy: on the west side King Charles II is shown with his father King Charles I whose parents King James I and Anne of Denmark are depicted on the east side.
During the 18th century the heads of convicted traitors were frequently mounted on pikes and exhibited on the roof, as was the case on London Bridge. The other seven principal gateways to London, (Ludgate, Newgate, Aldersgate, Cripplegate, Moorgate, Bishopsgate and Aldgate) were all demolished in the 1760s, but Temple Bar remained despite its impediment to the ever-growing traffic. The upper-storey room was leased to the neighbouring banking house of Child & Co for storage of records.

In the 1853 Bleak House, Charles Dickens described it as "that leaden-headed old obstruction, appropriate ornament for the threshold of a leaden-headed old corporation". It was also the subject of jokes, "Why is Temple Bar like a lady's veil? Both must be raised (razed) for "busses" ('buses). It was noted in jest "as a weak spot in our defenses", since one could walk through the adjoining  barbershop where one door opened on to the City and the other in the area of Westminster.

In 1874 it was discovered that the keystones had dropped and the arches were propped up with timbers. The steady increase in horse and cart traffic led to complaints that Temple Bar was becoming a bottleneck, holding back the City trade. In 1878 the City of London Corporation, eager to widen the road but unwilling to destroy so historic a monument, dismantled it piece-by-piece over an 11-day period and stored its 2,700 stones carefully. In 1880 the brewer Henry Meux, at the instigation of his wife Valerie Susan Meux, bought the stones and re-erected the arch as the facade of a new gatehouse in the park of his mansion house Theobalds Park in Hertfordshire, the site of a former substantial prodigy house of James VI and I. There it remained, positioned in a woodland clearing, until 2003. A plaque marks the site where Temple Bar once stood.

Present location

In March 1938 Theobalds Park was sold by Sir Hedworth Meux to Middlesex County Council, but the Temple Bar Gatehouse was excluded from the sale and retained by the Meux trustees. In 1984 it was bought by the Temple Bar Trust from the Meux Trust for the sum of £1. In December 2001 the City's Court of Common Council resolved to contribute funds for the return of Temple Bar Gate to the City. On 13 October 2003 the first stone was dismantled at Theobalds Park and all were placed on 500 pallets for storage. In 2004 it was returned to the City of London where it was painstakingly re-erected as an entrance to the Paternoster Square redevelopment immediately north of St Paul's Cathedral, opening to the public on 10 November 2004. The total cost of the project was over £3 million, funded mainly by the City of London, with donations from the Temple Bar Trust and several City Livery Companies.

In September 2022, Temple Bar London, consisting of the gateway and an adjacent building (Paternoster Lodge), was officially reopened by the Duke of Gloucester and the Lord Mayor of London Vincent Keaveny as the home of a livery company, the Worshipful Company of Chartered Architects, providing space for meetings and dining and an education centre funded by the Corporation of London's CIL Neighbourhood fund.

The top of one of the gates was offered for sale by Dreweatts Auctioneers in a London sale of surplus stock from LASSCO on 15 June 2013.

Temple Bar Memorial

Following the removal of Wren's gate, Horace Jones, Architect and Surveyor to the City of London, designed a memorial to mark Temple Bar, which was unveiled in 1880. The Temple Bar Memorial stands in front of the Royal Courts of Justice.

The elaborate pedestal in a neo-Renaissance style serves as the base for a sculpture by Charles Bell Birch of a dragon supporter (sometimes erroneously referred to as a griffin) bearing a shield of the arms of the City of London. The pedestal is decorated with statues by Joseph Boehm of Queen Victoria and her son the Prince of Wales, the last royals to have entered the City through Wren's gate, which event is depicted in one of the reliefs which also decorate the structure.

In the 1960s, similar but smaller and more subdued dragon sculptures were set at other entry points to the City. Two were originally created in 1849 by J. B. Bunning for the entrance to the Coal Exchange (and were relocated to Victoria Embankment following that building's demolition in 1962), while the others are smaller-scale versions of Bunning's design.

In fiction

Charles Dickens mentioned Temple Bar in A Tale of Two Cities (Book II, Chapter I), noting its proximity to the fictional Tellson's Bank on Fleet Street. This was in fact Child & Co., which used the upper rooms of Temple Bar as storage space. Whilst critiquing the moral poverty of late 18th-century London, Dickens wrote that in matters of crime and punishment, "putting to death was a recipe much in vogue," and illustrated the horror caused by severed heads "exposed on Temple Bar with an insensate brutality and ferocity..."

In Herman Melville's The Paradise of Bachelors and the Tartarus of Maids, he contrasts the beauty of the Temple Bar gateway with the highest point on the road leading to the hellish paper factory, which he calls a "Dantean Gateway" (in his Inferno, Dante describes the gateway to Hell, over which are written the words, "Abandon hope, all ye who enter here.")

The dragon on top of the Temple Bar monument comes to life in Charlie Fletcher's children's book about London, Stoneheart.

The dragon also features in Virginia Woolf's The Years, in which one of the main characters, Martin, points "at the splayed-out figure at Temple Bar; it looked as ridiculous as usual – something between a serpent and a fowl."

See also
 Dragon boundary mark
 Temple Bar, Dublin, a district of the same name in Dublin, Ireland

Notes

References

External links

Temple Bar London website
Victorian Web
The Return of Temple Bar to the City of London website
 City of London website with history of Temple Bar

 

Christopher Wren buildings in London
Buildings and structures in the City of London
History of the City of London
Grade I listed gates
Buildings and structures completed in 1672
Relocated buildings and structures in the United Kingdom
Tourist attractions in the City of London
1672 establishments in England